The genus Arachnis, abbreviated as Arach in horticultural trade, (common namescorpion orchid,) is a member of the orchid family (Orchidaceae), consisting of more than 20 species native to China, India, Southeast Asia, Indonesia, the Philippines, New Guinea, and the Solomon Islands.

Description

Vegetative characteristics
The appearance of the monopodial, epiphytic herbs of the genus Arachnis is characterized by distichously arranged, linear leaves. The vining plants may grow into a dense thicket. Arachnis does not produce pseudobulbs.

Generative characteristics
The flowers are thought to resemble spiders, and they are fragrant. The fragrance has been described as musky.

Etymology
The generic epithet Arachnis is derived from the Greek word arachne for spider.

Ecology

Habitat
Arachnis senapatiana has been found growing in subtropical broad-leaved forests at elevations of 1747 m above sea level.

Flowering
Arachnis senapatiana is known to flower in June.

Taxonomy

Accepted species
There are currently 16 accepted species, including one natural hybrid:
Arachnis annamensis (Rolfe) J.J.Sm.
Arachnis bella (Rchb.f.) J.J.Sm.
Arachnis bouffordii Ormerod
Arachnis calcarata Holttum
Arachnis cathcartii (Lindl.) J.J.Sm.
Arachnis clarkei (Rchb.f.) J.J.Sm.
Arachnis flos-aeris (L.) Rchb.f.
Arachnis grandisepala J.J.Wood
Arachnis hookeriana (Rchb.f.) Rchb.f.
Arachnis labrosa (Lindl. & Paxton) Rchb.f.
Arachnis limax Seidenf.
Arachnis longisepala (J.J.Wood) Shim & A.Lamb
Arachnis × maingayi (Hook.f.) Schltr.
Arachnis senapatiana (Phukan & A.A.Mao) Kocyan & Schuit.
Arachnis seramensis (Ormerod) R.Rice
Arachnis siamensis (Schltr.) Tang & F.T.Wang
[[Arachnis sulingi]] (Blume) Rchb.f.

Species formerly placed in Arachnis
Arachnis beccarii Rchb.f. is now considered to be Dimorphorchis beccarii (Rchb.f.) Kocyan & Schuit.
Arachnis breviscapa (J.J.Sm.) J.J.Sm. is now considered to be Dimorphorchis breviscapa (J.J.Sm.) Kocyan & Schuit.
Arachnis celebica (Schltr.) J.J.Sm. is now considered to be Dimorphorchis celebica (Schltr.) Ormerod
Arachnis imthurnii (Rolfe) L.O.Williams is now considered to be Dimorphorchis beccarii var. imthurnii (Rolfe) Kocyan & Schuit.
Arachnis longicaulis (Schltr.) L.O.Williams is now considered to be Dimorphorchis breviscapa (J.J.Sm.) Kocyan & Schuit.
Arachnis lowii (Lindl.) Rchb.f. is now considered to be Dimorphorchis lowii (Lindl.) Rolfe
Arachnis lyonii Ames is now considered to be Dimorphorchis lyonii (Ames) Ormerod
Arachnis muelleri (Kraenzl.) J.J.Sm. is now considered to be Dimorphorchis beccarii var. beccarii
Arachnis philippinensis (Lindl.) Ames is now considered to be Trichoglottis philippinensis Lindl.
Arachnis rohaniana (Rchb.f.) Rchb.f. is now considered to be Dimorphorchis rohaniana (Rchb.f.) P.J.Cribb
Arachnis beccarii var. imthurnii (Rolfe) K.W.Tan is now considered to be Dimorphorchis beccarii var. imthurnii (Rolfe) Kocyan & Schuit.
Arachnis longicaulis f. flavescens Valmayor & D.Tiu is now considered to be Dimorphorchis breviscapa (J.J.Sm.) Kocyan & Schuit.

Conservation
Arachnis has become extinct in  Nansei-shoto .

Horticulture
It can be cultivated under warm and moist conditions growing in pots, baskets, or mounted on slabs.

References

External links
 
 

 
Vandeae genera
Orchids of China
Orchids of India
Orchids of Thailand
Orchids of Vietnam
Orchids of the Philippines
Orchids of Malaysia
Orchids of Indonesia
Orchids of New Guinea